The Lottery of Huruslahti was a massacre and alleged decimation that occurred in Varkaus, Finland in the Finnish Civil War. In it, approximately 90 Red (communist) prisoners were killed by the White (anti-communist) troops, after the Battle of Varkaus in 1918.

It was the first application of the Shoot on the Spot Declaration, which ordered that all Red leaders, agitators, and saboteurs caught red-handed, and whoever had actually participated in violence should be shot without trial, defining this as justifiable homicide rather than a death sentence. It was claimed by the Reds that the White troops, after the Battle of Varkaus, ordered all the captured Reds to assemble in a single row on the ice of Huruslahti, selected first all leaders and then every fifth prisoner, and executed them on the spot. The number executed was 10% of the accused. The Whites claimed that they individually selected each victim based on known identities and acts of violence rather than randomly, even though many victims were underage and had not participated in the battle. Furthermore, the condemned were first separated from the rest and then shot in groups of five.

The legality of the event been debated: in modern terms, it would be considered a war crime. It was apparently embarrassing to the White leadership already at the time: there was no declaration of war, and the apparent legality was completely based on a military order, not law as conventionally required. The Senate considered the victims as "armed civilians". Without a particular law to authorize the death penalty, the executions can be considered illegal. However, the newly independent state of Finland had not signed any treaties on the laws of war, such as the Brussels Declaration of 1874 or the Hague Conventions of 1899 and 1907. The general amnesty laws adopted after the war absolved all perpetrators from judicial responsibility.

See also
History of Finland#Independence and Civil War

References

Finnish Civil War
1918 in Finland
History of North Savo